12 Andromedae is a single star in the northern constellation of Andromeda. The designation is from the star catalogue of English astronomer John Flamsteed, first published in 1712. It has an apparent visual magnitude of 5.87, which indicates it is just visible to the naked eye under good seeing conditions. An annual parallax shift of 23.7806 mas provides a distance estimate of 137 light years. The star is moving closer to the Sun with a radial velocity of −10.5 km/s.

This is an ordinary F-type main-sequence star with a stellar classification of F5 V.  It is about 2.5 billion years old and is spinning with a projected rotational velocity of 12 km/s. The abundance of iron is similar to that in the Sun. The star has an estimated 1.25 times the mass of the Sun and is radiating just over 7 times the Sun's luminosity from its photosphere at an effective temperature of around 6,454 K.

References

External links
 Image 12 Andromedae

F-type main-sequence stars
Andromeda (constellation)
Durchmusterung objects
Andromedae, 12
220117
115280
8885